Christian Bahmann (born 22 July 1981 in Plauen) is a German slalom canoeist who competed at the international level from 1999 to 2008.

He won a gold in the C2 event at the 2005 ICF Canoe Slalom World Championships in Penrith. He also won a silver and a bronze at the European Championships.

Bahmann finished fourth in the C2 event at the 2004 Summer Olympics together with former Olympic bronze medalist Michael Senft.

Christian Bahmann is the son of Angelika Bahmann, winner of the women's K1 event at the 1972 Summer Olympics in Munich.

World Cup individual podiums

1 World Championship counting for World Cup points

References

ICF medalists for Olympic and World Championships - Part 2: rest of flatwater (now sprint) and remaining canoeing disciplines: 1936-2007.
Yahoo! Sports Athens 2004 profile

1981 births
Living people
People from Plauen
People from Bezirk Karl-Marx-Stadt
German male canoeists
Sportspeople from Saxony
Olympic canoeists of Germany
Canoeists at the 2004 Summer Olympics
Medalists at the ICF Canoe Slalom World Championships